Fuzzy set operations are a generalization of crisp set operations for fuzzy sets. There is in fact more than one possible generalization.  The most widely used operations are called standard fuzzy set operations; they comprise:  fuzzy complements, fuzzy intersections, and fuzzy unions.

Standard fuzzy set operations
Let A and B be fuzzy sets that A,B ⊆ U, u is any element (e.g. value) in the U universe: u ∈ U.

Standard complement

The complement is sometimes denoted by ∁A or A∁ instead of ¬A.

Standard intersection

Standard union

In general, the triple (i,u,n) is called De Morgan Triplet iff
 i is a t-norm,
 u is a t-conorm (aka s-norm),
 n is a strong negator,
so that for all x,y ∈ [0, 1] the following holds true: 
u(x,y) = n( i( n(x), n(y) ) ) 
(generalized De Morgan relation). This implies the axioms provided below in detail.

Fuzzy complements
μA(x) is defined as the degree to which x belongs to A. Let ∁A denote a fuzzy complement of A of type c. Then μ∁A(x) is the degree to which x belongs to ∁A, and the degree to which x does not belong to A. (μA(x) is therefore the degree to which x does not belong to ∁A.) Let a complement ∁A be defined by a function

c : [0,1] → [0,1]

For all x ∈ U:  μ∁A(x) = c(μA(x))

Axioms for fuzzy complements
Axiom c1. Boundary condition
c(0) = 1 and c(1) = 0

Axiom c2. Monotonicity
For all a, b ∈ [0, 1], if a < b, then c(a) > c(b)

Axiom c3. Continuity
c is continuous function.

Axiom c4. Involutions 
c is an involution, which means that c(c(a)) = a for each a ∈ [0,1]
c is a strong negator (aka fuzzy complement).

A function c satisfying axioms c1 and c3 has at least one fixpoint a* with c(a*) = a*,
and if axiom c2 is fulfilled as well there is exactly one such fixpoint. For the standard negator c(x) = 1-x the unique fixpoint is a* = 0.5 .

Fuzzy intersections

The intersection of two fuzzy sets A and B is specified in general by a binary operation on the unit interval, a function of the form      
  
i:[0,1]×[0,1] → [0,1].

For all x ∈ U:  μA ∩ B(x) = i[μA(x), μB(x)].

Axioms for fuzzy intersection
Axiom i1. Boundary condition
i(a, 1) = a

Axiom i2. Monotonicity
b ≤ d implies i(a, b) ≤ i(a, d)

Axiom i3. Commutativity
i(a, b) = i(b, a)

Axiom i4. Associativity
i(a, i(b, d)) = i(i(a, b), d)

Axiom i5. Continuity
i is a continuous function

Axiom i6. Subidempotency
i(a, a) < a for all 0 < a < 1

Axiom i7. Strict monotonicity
i (a1, b1) < i (a2, b2) if a1 < a2 and  b1 < b2

Axioms i1 up to i4 define a t-norm (aka fuzzy intersection). The standard t-norm min is the only idempotent t-norm (that is, i (a1, a1) = a for all a ∈ [0,1]).

Fuzzy unions
The union of two fuzzy sets A and B is specified in general by a binary operation on the unit interval function of the form

u:[0,1]×[0,1] → [0,1].

For all x ∈ U:  μA ∪ B(x) = u[μA(x), μB(x)].

Axioms for fuzzy union
Axiom u1.  Boundary condition
u(a, 0) =u(0 ,a) = a

Axiom u2. Monotonicity
b ≤ d implies u(a, b) ≤ u(a, d)

Axiom u3. Commutativity
u(a, b) = u(b, a)

Axiom u4. Associativity
u(a, u(b, d)) = u(u(a, b), d)

Axiom u5. Continuityu is a continuous function

Axiom u6. Superidempotencyu(a, a) > a for all 0 < a < 1

Axiom u7. Strict monotonicitya1 < a2 and b1 < b2  implies u(a1, b1) < u(a2, b2)

Axioms u1 up to u4 define a t-conorm (aka s-norm or fuzzy union). The standard t-conorm max is the only idempotent t-conorm (i. e. u (a1, a1) = a for all a ∈ [0,1]).

Aggregation operations
Aggregation operations on fuzzy sets are operations by which several fuzzy sets are combined in a desirable way to produce a single fuzzy set.

Aggregation operation on n fuzzy set (2 ≤ n) is defined by a functionh:[0,1]n → [0,1]

Axioms for aggregation operations fuzzy sets
Axiom h1. Boundary conditionh(0, 0, ..., 0) = 0  and  h(1, 1, ..., 1) = one

Axiom h2. MonotonicityFor any pair <a1, a2, ..., an> and <b1, b2, ..., bn> of n-tuples such that ai, bi ∈ [0,1] for all i ∈ Nn, if ai ≤ bi for all i ∈ Nn, then h(a1, a2, ...,an) ≤ h(b1, b2, ..., bn); that is, h is monotonic increasing in all its arguments.

Axiom h3. Continuityh'' is a continuous function.

See also
 Fuzzy logic
 Fuzzy set
 T-norm
 Type-2 fuzzy sets and systems
 De Morgan algebra

Further reading

References

 L.A. Zadeh. Fuzzy sets. Information and Control, 8:338–353, 1965

Fuzzy logic